The Alpine Valleys is an Australian wine region on the western slopes of the Victorian Alps in northeast Victoria. It was registered as an Australian Geographical Indication on  It is bounded to the west by the King Valley and to the north by the Beechworth wine region. The area is distinctly cooler in climate than some of the other northeast wine regions like Rutherglen. The Alpine Valleys produce grapes primarily for table wine production.

The Alpine Valleys wine region includes the valleys of the Ovens, Buffalo, Buckland and Kiewa rivers. Towns in the region include Myrtleford and Bright.

Small quantities of tea are grown and produced in the Alpine Valleys.

See also
Victorian wine

References

Wine regions of Victoria (Australia)
Regions of Victoria (Australia)